Colpichthys is a genus of Neotropical silverside endemic to the Gulf of California.

Species
The currently recognized species in this genus are:
 Colpichthys hubbsi C. B. Crabtree, 1989 (delta silverside)
 Colpichthys regis (O. P. Jenkins & Evermann, 1889) (false grunion)

References

Atherinopsidae